The 1958 Lamar Tech Cardinals football team was an American football team that represented Lamar State College of Technology—now known Lamar University–as a member of the Lone Star Conference (LSC) during the 1958 NCAA College Division football season. Led by sixth-year head coach James B. Higgins, the Cardinals compiled an overall record of 6–2 with a mark of 5–2 in conference play, tying for second place in the LSC.

Schedule

References

Lamar Tech
Lamar Cardinals football seasons
Lamar Tech Cardinals football